The Division of Groom is an Australian Electoral Division in Queensland.

Groom is an agricultural electorate located on the Darling Downs in southern Queensland. It includes the regional city of Toowoomba and rural communities to the west and south.

The current MP is Garth Hamilton, a member of the Liberal National Party of Queensland.

Geography
Since 1984, federal electoral division boundaries in Australia have been determined at redistributions by a redistribution committee appointed by the Australian Electoral Commission. Redistributions occur for the boundaries of divisions in a particular state, and they occur every seven years, or sooner if a state's representation entitlement changes or when divisions of a state are malapportioned.

History

The division was created in 1984 as essentially a reconfigured version of the old Division of Darling Downs, which had existed since Federation. It is named in honour of Sir Littleton Groom, who represented Darling Downs with only one short break from 1901 to 1936 and served as Speaker of the Australian House of Representatives.

It is located in the rural areas west of Brisbane and is centred on the city of Toowoomba, Australia's second largest inland city. Other centres include Oakey and Pittsworth.

The seat has never elected a Labor member in either of its incarnations as Darling Downs or Groom.  While Toowoomba itself (particularly, the northern suburbs) occasionally votes for Labor, it is nowhere near enough to overcome the conservative bent of the rural areas.

Groom's electors are socially conservative. In 2017, it was one of only three electorates in Queensland to vote against the Marriage Survey.

2020 Groom by-election

Members

Election results

References

External links
 Division of Groom (Qld) — Australian Electoral Commission

Electoral divisions of Australia
Constituencies established in 1984
1984 establishments in Australia
Federal politics in Queensland
Darling Downs
Toowoomba